Rakasurya Handika Aryabagasakti (born on 13 June 2000) is an Indonesian professional footballer who plays as a goalkeeper for Liga 1 club Bali United.

Career

Bali United
On 23 April 2018, Rakasurya officially signed a year contract with Bali United. In his first season, he was first-choice goalkeeper for Bali United U-19 in 2018 Liga 1 U-19. Bali United registered him for 2019 Liga 1 to completes the quota of U-23 players.

He finally made his long-awaited debut on the last match of 2021–22 Liga 1.

Career statistics

Club

Notes

References

External links
Rakasurya Handika at Bali United Official Website

2000 births
Living people
Indonesian footballers
Liga 1 (Indonesia) players
Association football goalkeepers
Sportspeople from Central Java
Bali United F.C. players
People from Semarang